The 1926 UCI Track Cycling World Championships were the World Championship for track cycling. They took place in Milan and Turin in Italy from 24 July to 1 August 1926. Three events for men were contested, two for professionals and one for amateurs.

Medal summary

Medal table

See also
 1926 UCI Road World Championships

References

Track cycling
UCI Track Cycling World Championships by year
International cycle races hosted by Italy
Sports competitions in Milan
Sports competitions in Turin
UCI World Championships
1920s in Milan
1920s in Turin
UCI Track Cycling World Championships
UCI Track Cycling World Championships